Klaus Ernst (born 1 November 1954 in Munich) is a left-wing German politician and was a leading member of the Labour and Social Justice Party and now The Left. The certified political economist has served as a member of The Left in the Bundestag since 2005, and as of 2010 has been co-chairing the party together with Gesine Lötzsch.

Career 
At the age of 15 he left his home and school because of his violent father. In 1970 he found work as an electronics technician and was elected youth representative and member of the works council. In 1972 he became a member of the German Metalworkers' Union and in 1974 he took the chair of regional trade unions youth organization in Munich (until 1979) and became a partymember of the Social Democratic Party of Germany. From 1979 to 1984 he studied political economy at the University of Hamburg.

After his studies he became a trade union secretary in Stuttgart, responsible for organization, educational work and social plans. In 1995 Ernst was elected plenipotentiary of the IG Metall in Schweinfurt.

He took objection to the Agenda 2010, which he considered anti-social. Instead he pleaded for the establishment of a political alliance, an electoral alternative with regard to the German federal election in 2005. In the summer of 2004 the party executive decided his expulsion from the Social Democratic Party (SPD).

Ernst became chairman of the association "Wahlalternative Arbeit und soziale Gerechtigkeit e. V." which had been founded on 3 July 2004. Later he became leader of the new founded Electoral Alternative for Labor and Social Justice, which emerged from the association.

Political opinions 
In January 2022, he demanded that Ukraine cannot be admitted to NATO.  He criticized halting Nord Stream 2.

References

External links 

 Website of Klaus Ernst
 Website about Klaus Ernst by IG Metall

1954 births
Living people
Politicians from Munich
Social Democratic Party of Germany politicians
Labour and Social Justice – The Electoral Alternative politicians
Members of the Bundestag for Bavaria
Members of the Bundestag 2021–2025
Members of the Bundestag 2017–2021
Members of the Bundestag 2013–2017
Members of the Bundestag 2009–2013
Members of the Bundestag 2005–2009
Members of the Bundestag for The Left
German trade unionists